Giovani Segura Aguilar (born 1 April 1982) is a Mexican professional boxer. He is a former WBA, WBO, Lineal and The Ring magazine light flyweight champion.

Amateur career
Giovani began boxing at the age of 15 and had an amateur record of 38–4.

Professional career
Segura made his professional debut on March 28, 2003. He accumulated a record of 18–0–1, which included wins against future champion Carlos Tamara and former champion Daniel Reyes.

WBA Light Flyweight Champion 
Giovanni challenged Colombian César Canchila for the Interim WBA Light Flyweight title. Segura lost the bout by unanimous decision, but subsequently claimed the interim title by knocking out Canchila in a rematch on March 14, 2009.

He was elevated to full champion on June 5, 2009. Segura defended his newly acquired title on July 25, 2009 by stopping Juanito Rubillar in six rounds. On November 21, 2009, he defended his title against Sonny Boy Jaro by first round knock out. On February 20, 2010, he defended his title for a third time against Walter Tello.

Segura vs. Calderon I & II 
On August 28, 2010 Giovani fought undefeated WBO Light Flyweight champion Iván Calderón in a unification bout. Segura went on to knock out Calderón in the eighth round, successfully unifying his WBA title with the Puerto Rican's WBO and Lineal Light Flyweight Championships. In his next fight, he defeated former champion Manuel Vargas via 7th round stoppage.

Segura and Iván Calderón would meet again in April 2011. Segura won the rematch by third round knockout. Following that victory, Segura vacated his titles in order to move up to the Flyweight division where he was KO by Brian Viloria.

Professional boxing record

{|class="wikitable" style="text-align:center"
|-
!No.
!Result
!Record
!Opponent
!Type
!Round, time
!Date
!Location
!Notes
|-
|38
|Win 
|33–4–1 
|align=left|Ernesto Guerrero
|KO
|3 (8)
|Jun 18, 2016
|align=left|
|align=left|
|- align=center
|37
|Loss
|32–4–1 
|align=left|Juan Francisco Estrada
|TKO
|11 (12)
|Sep 6, 2014
|align=left|
|align=left|
|- align=center
|36
|Win 
|32–3–1 
|align=left|Felipe Salguero
|TKO
|10 (10)
|Apr 5, 2014
|align=left|
|align=left|
|- align=center
|35
|Win 
|31–3–1 
|align=left|Hernán Márquez
|KO
|12 (12)
|Nov 2, 2013
|align=left|
|align=left|
|- align=center
|34
|Win 
|30–3–1 
|align=left| Jonathan Gonzalez
|KO
|4 (10)
|Aug 17, 2013
|align=left| 
|align=left|
|- align=center
|33
|Loss || 29–3–1 ||align=left|Edgar Sosa
|UD|| small|12 || May 18, 2013 ||align=left|
|align=left|
|- align=center
|32
|Win || 29–2–1 ||align=left|Omar Salado
|TKO|| 9 (10)|| Feb 23, 2013||align=left|
|align=left|
|- align=center
|31
|Loss || 28–2–1 ||align=left| Brian Viloria
|TKO|| 8 (12) || Dec 10, 2011||align=left| 
|align=left|
|- align=center
|30
|Win || 28–1–1 ||align=left| Eddy Zuniga
|TKO|| 1 (10)|| May 28, 2011||align=left|
|align=left|
|- align=center
|29
|Win || 27–1–1 ||align=left| Iván Calderón
|KO|| 3 (12) || Apr 2, 2011||align=left|
|align=left|
|- align=center
|28
|Win || 26–1–1 ||align=left|Manuel Vargas
|RTD|| 7 (10)||Nov 27, 2010||align=left|
|align=left|
|- align=center
|27
|Win || 25–1–1 ||align=left| Iván Calderón
|KO|| 8 (12) || Aug 28, 2010 ||align=left| 
|align=left|
|- align=center
|26
|Win || 24–1–1 ||align=left| Ronald Ramos
|RTD|| 4 (10) || Apr 27, 2010||align=left|
|align=left|
|- align=center
|25
|Win || 23–1–1 ||align=left| Walter Tello
|TKO|| 3 (12)|| Feb 20, 2010|| align=left|
|align=left|
|- align=center
|24
|Win || 22–1–1 || align=left| Sonny Boy Jaro
|KO|| 1 (12) || Nov 21, 2009  || align=left|
|align=left|
|- align=center
|23
|Win || 21–1–1 || align=left| Juanito Rubillar
|TKO|| 6 (12)|| Jul 25, 2009 || align=left|
|align=left|
|- align=center
|22
|Win || 20–1–1 || align=left| César Canchila
|TKO|| 4 (12)|| Apr 14, 2009 || align=left|
|align=left|
|- align=center
|21
| || 19–1–1 || align=left| César Canchila
|UD|| 12 || small|Jul 26, 2008|| align=left|
|align=left|
|- align=center
|20
|Win || 19–0–1 ||align=left| Wilfrido Valdez
|KO|| 1 (10)|| Oct 26, 2007 || align=left|
|align=left|
|- align=center
|19
|Win || 18–0–1 ||align=left| Daniel Reyes 
|KO|| 1 (12)||Jun 8, 2007|| align=left|
|align=left|
|- align=center
|18
|Win || 17–0–1 || align=left|Jesus Martinez
|TKO|| 5 (12) || Feb 16, 2007|| align=left|
|align=left|
|- align=center
|17
|Win || 16–0–1 || align=left| Carlos Tamara
|UD|| 12|| Nov 3, 2006 || align=left|
|align=left|
|- align=center
|16
|Win || 15–0–1 || align=left| Jair Jimenez
|TKO|| 4 (12) || Sep 18, 2006 || align=left|
|align=left|
|- align=center
|15
|Win || 14–0–1 || align=left|Valentin Leon
|KO|| 3 (10) || May 5, 2006 || align=left|
|align=left|
|- align=center
|14
|Win || 13–0–1 || align=left|Francisco Arce
|TKO|| 1 (8) || Mar 3, 2006 || align=left|
|align=left|
|- align=center
|13
|Win || 12–0–1 || align=left|Juan Carlos Perez
|KO|| 1 (8)|| Jan 20, 2006 || align=left|
|align=left|
|- align=center
|12
|Win || 11–0–1 || align=left|Benjamin Garcia
|SD||small|8  || Nov 25, 2005 || align=left|
|align=left|
|- align=center
|11
|Win || 10–0–1 || align=left|Juan Javier Lagos
|KO|| 6 (8) || Oct 7, 2005|| align=left|
|align=left|
|- align=center
|10
|Win || 9–0–1 || align=left|Francisco Soto
|TKO|| 5 (8) || Jun 18, 2005|| align=left|
|align=left|
|- align=center
|9
|Win || 8–0–1 || align=left|Roberto Gomez
|TKO||4 (6) || May 6, 2005|| align=left|
|align=left|
|- align=center
|8
|Win || 7–0–1 || align=left|Felipe Rivas
|UD|| 6|| Nov 26, 2004 || align=left|
|align=left|
|- align=center
|7
|Win || 6–0–1 || align=left|Jose Antonio Rico
|TKO|| 1 (8)|| Apr 23, 2004 || align=left| 
|align=left|
|- align=center
|6
|Win || 5–0–1 || align=left|Saidi Warandu
|TKO|| 1 (4)|| Jan 20, 2004|| align=left|
|align=left| 
|- align=center
|5
|Win || 4–0–1 || align=left|Mynor Marquez
|TKO|| 1 (4) || Dec 6, 2003|| align=left|
|align=left|
|- align=center
|4
|Win || 3–0–1 || align=left|Vicente Maroquin
|KO|| 1 (4) || Nov 21, 2003 || align=left|
|align=left|
|- align=center
|3
|Win || 2–0–1 || align=left|Benjamin Garcia
|KO|| 1 (4)|| Jul 19, 2003 || align=left|
|align=left|
|- align=center
|2
|Draw|| 1–0–1 || align=left|Benjamin Garcia
|SD|| 4 || Jul 5, 2003 || align=left|
|align=left|
|- align=center
|1
|Win || 1–0 || align=left|Jesus Valadez
|UD|| 4|| Mar 28, 2003 || align=left|
|align=left|
|- align=center

See also
List of Mexican boxing world champions
List of world light-flyweight boxing champions

References

External links

 

1982 births
Living people
Mexican male boxers
Boxers from Guerrero
People from Ciudad Altamirano, Guerrero
Flyweight boxers
World light-flyweight boxing champions
World Boxing Association champions
World Boxing Organization champions
The Ring (magazine) champions